Eduard Hermann (23 December 1891 – 22 March 1947) was a Greco-Roman wrestler from Estonia. He took up wrestling in 1904, and placed sixth in the 60 kg division at the 1911 World Wrestling Championships. After that he won several Baltic championships and frequently competed in Finland.

References

1891 births
1947 deaths
Sportspeople from Tartu
People from the Governorate of Livonia
Estonian male sport wrestlers